Koitiata is a settlement located in the southwestern part of Rangitikei District of the Manawatū-Whanganui region of New Zealand's North Island. At the time of the 2018 census, Koitiata had a population of 128. Marton is located 24 km to the east and Whanganui is located 29 km to the northwest. Nearby Koitiata is Lake Koitiata.

Government and politics

Local government

As part of the Rangitikei District, the current Mayor of Rangitikei since 2013 is Andy Watson.

Koitiata forms part of the Turakina ward of the Rangitikei District Council, which elects one of the eleven district councillors. The one representative of the ward is Soraya Peke-Mason. The mayor and councillors are all due for re-election in October 2016.

National government
Koitiata, like the rest of the Rangitikei District, is located in the general electorate of Rangitīkei and in the Māori electorate of Te Tai Hauāuru. Rangitīkei is a safe National Party seat since the 1938 election with the exception of 1978–1984 when it was held by Bruce Beetham of the Social Credit Party. Since 2011 it is held by Ian McKelvie.

Te Tai Hauāuru is a more volatile seat, having been held by three different parties since 1996, i.e. New Zealand First, the Māori Party and the Labour Party. Since 2014 it is held by Adrian Rurawhe of the Labour Party.

Education

The nearest primary school is Turakina School in Turakina and the nearest secondary schools are in Whanganui and Marton.

Demographics

The population of Koitiata was 128 in the 2018 New Zealand census, an increase of 20 (18.5%) since the 2013 census, and an increase of 35 (37.6%) since the 2006 census. There were 75 males and 54 females, giving a sex ratio of 1.39 males per female. Ethnicities were 120 people  (93.8%) European/Pākehā and 9 (7.0%) Māori (totals add to more than 100% since people could identify with multiple ethnicities). Of the total population, 12 people  (9.4%) were under 15 years old, 9 (7.0%) were 15–29, 69 (53.9%) were 30–64, and 42 (32.8%) were over 65.

Transport
State Highway 3  is located 8 km to the northeast of Koitiata. This national state highway connects Woodville (25 km east of Palmerston North) and Hamilton via New Plymouth.

The nearest airport is Whanganui Airport, located 30 km to the northwest of the town.

Fusilier shipwreck 
She was 24 years old and had been sailing in ballast from Wellington to Adelaide.

References

External links
Koitiata website

Populated places in Manawatū-Whanganui
Rangitikei District